Presqu'île is a meteorite crater in the territory equivalent to a regional county municipality (TE) of Jamésie in the Nord-du-Québec region of Quebec, Canada, located about  south of the city of Chapais.

The crater is exposed at the surface.

See also 
 Presqu'île Lake, a waterbody

References

External links 
 Aerial Exploration of the Presqu'ile Structure

Impact craters of Quebec
Cambrian impact craters
Landforms of Nord-du-Québec
Impact crater lakes